Opiate for the Masses was an American rock band from Los Angeles, California in 1999.

History
Opiate for the Masses was founded in 1999 by singer Ron Underwood, drummer Elias Mallin, guitarist/keyboardist Jim Kaufman, and guitarist Dustin Lyon. The group's name is an alteration of Karl Marx's famous aphorism, "Religion is the opium of the people". Opiate for the Masses self-released a demo album entitled New Machines and the Wasted Life in 2000. In 2005, the band signed with Warcon Enterprises and issued the album The Spore. By this time the group had added Seven Antonopoulos on drums and Anna K. (of Drain STH) on bass. The group played the Taste of Chaos tour and opened for Static-X, Avenged Sevenfold, My Chemical Romance, and Disturbed on tour. In 2008, the group signed with Century Media and released the album Manifesto. The group followed the release of Manifesto by touring with Filter. In 2009, the group disbanded.

Original members
Ron Underwood – vocals
Elias Mallin – drums
Dustin Lyon – guitars
Ryan Head – bass
Jim Kaufman – keyboards, guitar

Touring members
Seven Antonopoulos – drums
Anna K. – bass

Discography
New Machines and the Wasted Life (Self-released, 2000)
Seven EP (Self-released, 2001)
Goodbye EP (Self-released, 2003)
The Spore (Warcon Enterprises, 2005)
Manifesto (Century Media, 2008)

Reunion
In 2010, original Opiate for the Masses members Ron Underwood, Elias Mallin, Dustin Lyon, Ryan Head, and guitarist Andy Gerold played a reunion show to a sold-out crowd in Tempe, Arizona.

References

Musical groups from Los Angeles
Rock music groups from California